The 2017–18 Alaska Aces season was the 32nd season of the franchise in the Philippine Basketball Association (PBA).

Key dates

2017
October 29: The 2017 PBA draft took place in Midtown Atrium, Robinson Place Manila.

Draft picks

Roster

  also serves as Alaska's board governor.

Philippine Cup

Eliminations

Standings

Game log

|-bgcolor=ffcccc
| 1
| December 20
| Magnolia
| L 95–108
| Abueva, Manuel (20)
| Calvin Abueva (15)
| Chris Banchero (8)
| Filoil Flying V Centre
| 0–1
|-bgcolor=ffcccc
| 2
| December 29
| TNT
| L 98–106
| Jeron Teng (28)
| Jeron Teng (10)
| Jeron Teng (5)
| Cuneta Astrodome
| 0–2

|-bgcolor=ccffcc
| 3
| January 10
| Meralco
| W 103–98
| Abueva, Manuel (19)
| Abueva, J. Pascual (9)
| JVee Casio (4)
| Smart Araneta Coliseum
| 1–2
|-bgcolor=ccffcc
| 4
| January 14
| Kia
| W 102–65
| Jeron Teng (23)
| J. Pascual (11)
| Banchero, Potts (5)
| Smart Araneta Coliseum
| 2–2
|-bgcolor=ccffcc
| 5
| January 21
| Barangay Ginebra
| W 97–83
| Vic Manuel (18)
| Calvin Abueva (9)
| Banchero, Enciso (6)
| Ynares Center
| 3–2
|-bgcolor=ccffcc
| 6
| January 27
| Blackwater
| W 88–84
| Banchero, Manuel (16)
| Banchero, Cruz (7)
| Simon Enciso (3)
| Smart Araneta Coliseum
| 4–2
|-bgcolor=ccffcc
| 7
| January 31
| Phoenix
| W 93–75
| Chris Banchero (22)
| Calvin Abueva (14)
| Kevin Racal (6)
| Mall of Asia Arena
| 5–2

|-bgcolor=ccffcc
| 8
| February 4
| GlobalPort
| W 105–98 (OT)
| Vic Manuel (21)
| Calvin Abueva (12)
| JVee Casio (5)
| Ynares Center
| 6–2
|-bgcolor=ffcccc
| 9
| February 11
| NLEX
| L 89–96
| three players (12)
| Carl Bryan Cruz (8)
| Enciso, Exciminiano (4)
| Smart Araneta Coliseum
| 6–3
|-bgcolor=ffcccc
| 10
| February 17
| San Miguel
| L 96–109
| JVee Casio (20)
| Carl Bryan Cruz (12)
| JVee Casio (6)
| Batangas City Coliseum
| 6–4
|-bgcolor=ccffcc
| 11
| February 23
| Rain or Shine
| W 99–95
| JVee Casio (22)
| Casio, Thoss (10)
| JVee Casio (10)
| Smart Araneta Coliseum
| 7–4

Playoffs

Bracket

Game log

|-bgcolor=ffcccc
| 1
| March 5
| NLEX
| L 99–105
| Chris Banchero (20)
| Calvin Abueva (13)
| Abueva, Casio, Thoss (3)
| Mall of Asia Arena
| 0–1
|-bgcolor=ffcccc
| 2
| March 7
| NLEX
| L 83–87
| Calvin Abueva (17)
| Calvin Abueva (16)
| JVee Casio (6)
| Smart Araneta Coliseum
| 0–2

Commissioner's Cup

Eliminations

Standings

Game log

|-bgcolor=ffcccc
| 1
| April 27
| Rain or Shine
| L 103–109 (OT)
| Antonio Campbell (40)
| Antonio Campbell (20)
| Jvee Casio (6)
| Smart Araneta Coliseum
| 0–1
|-bgcolor=ccffcc
| 2
| April 29
| Blackwater
| W 93–74
| Vic Manuel (27)
| Antonio Campbell (19)
| Simon Enciso (7)
| Smart Araneta Coliseum
| 1–1

|-bgcolor=ccffcc
| 3
| May 4
| Columbian
| W 134–103
| Vic Manuel (26)
| Antonio Campbell (13)
| Chris Banchero (13)
| Smart Araneta Coliseum
| 2–1
|-bgcolor=ccffcc
| 4
| May 13
| TNT
| W 110–100
| Vic Manuel (29)
| Antonio Campbell (20)
| Chris Banchero (8)
| Ynares Center
| 3–1
|-bgcolor=ccffcc
| 5
| May 19
| San Miguel
| W 105–103
| Vic Manuel (23)
| Antonio Campbell (13)
| Chris Banchero (9)
| Lamberto Macias Sports and Cultural Center
| 4–1
|- align="center"
|colspan="9" bgcolor="#bbcaff"|All-Star Break

|-bgcolor=ccffcc
| 6
| June 2
| GlobalPort
| W 109–103
| Vic Manuel (22)
| Antonio Campbell (18)
| Chris Banchero (7)
| Smart Araneta Coliseum
| 5–1
|-bgcolor=ccffcc
| 7
| June 10
| Magnolia
| W 103–99
| Vic Manuel (35)
| Antonio Campbell (15)
| Chris Banchero (5)
| Smart Araneta Coliseum
| 6–1
|-bgcolor=ccffcc
| 8
| June 15
| NLEX
| W 120–111
| Antonio Campbell (28)
| Vic Manuel (11)
| Chris Banchero (7)
| Mall of Asia Arena
| 7–1
|-bgcolor=ffcccc
| 9
| June 17
| Meralco
| L 74–89
| Antonio Campbell (25)
| Antonio Campbell (14)
| Chris Banchero (5)
| Smart Araneta Coliseum
| 7–2
|-bgcolor=ffcccc
| 10
| June 24
| Barangay Ginebra
| L 86–105
| Vic Manuel (20)
| Campbell, Magat (8)
| Chris Banchero (4)
| Smart Araneta Coliseum
| 7–3

|-bgcolor=ccffcc
| 11
| July 6
| Phoenix
| W 114–91
| Vic Manuel (28)
| Diamon Simpson (19)
| Banchero, Enciso (7)
| Cuneta Astrodome
| 8–3

Playoffs

Bracket

Game log

|-bgcolor=ccffcc
| 1
| July 10
| Magnolia
| W 89–78
| Vic Manuel (22)
| Diamon Simpson (15)
| Enciso, Simpson (4)
| Smart Araneta Coliseum
| 1–0

|-bgcolor=ffcccc
| 1
| July 14
| San Miguel
| L 79–92
| Diamon Simpson (31)
| Diamon Simpson (24)
| JVee Casio (5)
| Mall of Asia Arena
| 0–1
|-bgcolor=ffcccc
| 2
| July 16
| San Miguel
| L 94–105
| Enciso, Simpson (19)
| Diamon Simpson (15)
| Simon Enciso (6)
| Smart Araneta Coliseum
| 0–2
|-bgcolor=ccffcc
| 3
| July 20
| San Miguel
| W 125–104
| Vic Manuel (24)
| Diamon Simpson (13)
| Simon Enciso (8)
| Ynares Center
| 1–2
|-bgcolor=ffcccc
| 4
| July 22
| San Miguel
| L 99–104
| Diamon Simpson (24)
| Diamon Simpson (21)
| Simon Enciso (7)
| Smart Araneta Coliseum
| 1–3

Governors' Cup

Eliminations

Standings

Game log

|-bgcolor=ccffcc
| 1
| August 24
| Meralco
| W 80–72
| Mike Harris (23)
| Mike Harris (15)
| Chris Banchero (5)
| Mall of Asia Arena
| 1–0
|-bgcolor=ccffcc
| 2
| August 26
| TNT
| W 125–96
| Simon Enciso (30)
| Mike Harris (24)
| Chris Banchero (14)
| Smart Araneta Coliseum
| 2–0
|-bgcolor=ccffcc
| 3
| August 29
| Phoenix
| W 108–97
| Mike Harris (23)
| Mike Harris (11)
| Chris Banchero (9)
| Smart Araneta Coliseum
| 3–0

|-bgcolor=ffcccc
| 4
| September 2
| Barangay Ginebra
| L 101–109
| Vic Manuel (28)
| Mike Harris (19)
| Chris Banchero (10)
| Smart Araneta Coliseum
| 3–1

|-bgcolor=ccffcc
| 5
| October 3
| Rain or Shine
| W 106–89
| Mike Harris (39)
| Mike Harris (25)
| Chris Banchero (13)
| Smart Araneta Coliseum
| 4–1
|-bgcolor=ccffcc
| 6
| October 6
| San Miguel
| W 127–119
| Mike Harris (36)
| Mike Harris (23)
| Chris Banchero (12)
| Ynares Center
| 5–1
|-bgcolor=ffcccc
| 7
| October 14
| Magnolia
| L 73–83
| Mike Harris (24)
| Mike Harris (25)
| Chris Banchero (7)
| Smart Araneta Coliseum
| 5–2
|-bgcolor=ccffcc
| 8
| October 17
| Columbian
| W 104–94
| Mike Harris (44)
| Mike Harris (27)
| Chris Banchero (11)
| Cuneta Astrodome
| 6–2
|-bgcolor=ccffcc
| 9
| October 21
| Blackwater
| W 116–109
| Mike Harris (38)
| Mike Harris (19)
| JVee Casio (7)
| Smart Araneta Coliseum
| 7–2
|-bgcolor=ffcccc
| 10
| October 26
| NLEX
| L 110–116 (OT)
| Mike Harris (35)
| Mike Harris (26)
| Chris Banchero (7)
| Smart Araneta Coliseum
| 7–3
|-bgcolor=ccffcc
| 11
| October 26
| NorthPort
| W 95–85
| Mike Harris (27)
| Mike Harris (25)
| Banchero, Harris (5)
| Smart Araneta Coliseum
| 8–3

Playoffs

Bracket

Game log

|-bgcolor=ccffcc
| 1
| November 7
| San Miguel
| W 96–85
| Mike Harris (25)
| Mike Harris (17)
| Baclao, Casio, Enciso, Teng (3)
| Cuneta Astrodome
| 1–0

|-bgcolor=ffcccc
| 1
| November 11
| Meralco
| L 92–97
| Mike Harris (37)
| Mike Harris (18)
| Chris Banchero (4)
| Ynares Center
| 0–1
|-bgcolor=ccffcc
| 2
| November 13
| Meralco
| W 100–95
| Mike Harris (37)
| Mike Harris (19)
| Chris Banchero (8)
| Mall of Asia Arena
| 1–1
|-bgcolor=ccffcc
| 3
| November 15
| Meralco
| W 104–102
| Mike Harris (31)
| Mike Harris (24)
| Mike Harris (7)
| Cuneta Astrodome
| 2–1
|-bgcolor=ccffcc
| 4
| November 17
| Meralco
| W 99–92
| Mike Harris (27)
| Mike Harris (14)
| Banchero, Enciso, Harris, Teng (3)
| Cuneta Astrodome
| 3–1

|-bgcolor=
| 1
| December 5
| Magnolia
| 
| 
| 
| 
| Mall of Asia Arena
| –
|-bgcolor=
| 2
| December 7
| Magnolia
| 
| 
| 
| 
| Smart Araneta Coliseum
| –
|-bgcolor=
| 3
| December 9
| Magnolia
| 
| 
| 
| 
| Ynares Center
| –
|-bgcolor=
| 4
| December 12
| Magnolia
| 
| 
| 
| 
| Smart Araneta Coliseum
| –
|-bgcolor=
| 5*
| December 14
| Magnolia
| 
| 
| 
| 
| Smart Araneta Coliseum
| –
|-bgcolor=
| 6*
| December 16
| Magnolia
| 
| 
| 
| 
| 
| –
|-bgcolor=
| 7*
| December 19
| Magnolia
| 
| 
| 
| 
| 
| –

Transactions

Trades

Pre season

Governor's Cup

Recruited imports

Awards

References

Alaska Aces (PBA) seasons
Alaska Aces